How to Find the Ideal is a 2007 Ukrainian comedy directed by Vera Yakovenko and starring Armen Grigoryan.

Plot
A young romantic girl Masha works in a bank. She is divorced, and is interested in a new relation. She met three men: one is a TV showman, the second is a famous musician, and the third is a scandally-known politician…

Cast 

 Zamira Kolkhieva
 Evgeny Sidikhin
 Armen Grigoryan
 Vitaly Yegorov
 Ostap Stupka
 Natalya Lukeyicheva
 Svetlana Orlichenko
 Stanislav Boklan
 Galina Davydova
 George Drozd
 Nina Nizheradze
 Vitaly Ivanchenko
 Kristina Khizhnyak
 Yaroslav Mysiv
 Ivan Dorn
 Konstantin Isayev (II)
 Julia Ananyeva
 Vitaly Salii

External links
 Kak nayti ideal

2007 films
2007 comedy films
Ukrainian comedy films
2000s Russian-language films